Mercier is French for notions dealer or haberdasher, and may refer to:

People
Agnès Mercier, French curler and coach
Annick Mercier (born 1964), French curler
Amanda H. Mercier (born 1975), American Judge
Armand Mercier, (1933–2012) former Mayor and City Councilor of Lowell, Massachusetts
Andrew Mercier, Canadian politician
Auguste Mercier, French general involved in the Dreyfus Affair
Claudine Mercier (born 1961), Canadian comedian, singer, actress and impressionist
Désiré-Joseph Mercier (1851–1926) Belgian cardinal
Émile Mercier (archer), French archer and Olympian
Emile Mercier (cartoonist) (1901–1981), Australian cartoonist
Gerry Mercier (born 1941), Canadian politician and judge
Honoré Mercier (1840–1894), Canadian politician
Isabelle Mercier (born 1975), Canadian poker player
Jason Mercier, American poker player
Juan Ignacio Mercier, Argentinian footballer
Laura Mercier, French cosmetician and name of cosmetics line
Lewis Page Mercier, or Louis Mercier, an English translator of Jules Verne's novels
Lizzy Mercier Descloux (1956–2004), French musician, actress, writer and painter
Louis-Sébastien Mercier (1740–1814), French writer
Michel Mercier, contemporary French politician
Michèle Mercier, French actress
Pascal Mercier, pseudonym of Swiss writer and philosopher Peter Bieri (born 1944)
Paul Mercier (actor), an American voice actor and director
Paul Mercier (Bloc Québécois MP) (1924–2013), Canadian Member of Parliament
Paul Mercier (Liberal MP) (1888–1943), Canadian Member of Parliament
Philippe Mercier, French painter
Pierre Mercier (footballer) (born 1982), Haitian international footballer
Sheila Mercier (1919–2019), English actress
Thierry Mercier (born 1967), French curler and coach
Vivian Mercier (1919–1989), Irish critic

Places

Canada
Mercier, Quebec, a South Shore suburb of Montreal
Mercier, Montreal, a former district in Montreal, and former municipality on Montreal Island
Mercier–Hochelaga-Maisonneuve, a borough of Montreal
Mercier-Est (Mercier East), a district in the borough of Mercier–Hochelaga-Maisonneuve, Montreal
Mercier-Ouest (Mercier West), a district in the borough of Mercier–Hochelaga-Maisonneuve, Montreal
Honoré-Mercier (electoral district), a federal electoral district, Quebec
Mercier (electoral district), a former federal electoral district, Quebec
Mercier (provincial electoral district), a Quebec provincial electoral district

United States
Mercier, Kansas, an unincorporated community

Other
Mercier (cycling team), French professional cycling team
Honoré Mercier Bridge, Quebec, Canada
Mercier Press, Cork, Ireland
Champagne Mercier, the French champagne producer

Surnames of French origin
French-language surnames
Occupational surnames